The 2022 AFC Champions League knockout stage will be played from 18 August 2022 to 6 May 2023. A total of 16 teams will compete in the knockout stage to decide the champions of the 2022 AFC Champions League.

Qualified teams
The group winners and three best-runners up in the group stage from each region advanced to the round of 16, with both West Region (Groups A–E) and East Region (Groups F–J) having eight qualified teams.

Format

In the knockout stage, the 16 teams will play a single-elimination tournament, with the teams split into the two regions until the final. All ties will be played as a single-leg match (Regulations Article 9.1), except the final played as a two-leg match. Extra time and penalty shoot-out will be used to decide the winners if necessary (Regulations Article 9.3 and 10.1).

Schedule
The schedule of each round is as follows.

Bracket

Round of 16

Combination tables

West Region

East Region

Summary

The round of 16 will be played over one leg, with the matchups determined by the combination tables based on which group runners-up qualified.

|+West Region

|+East Region

West Region

East Region

Quarter-finals

Summary

The quarter-finals will be played over one leg.

|+West Region

|+East Region

West Region

East Region

Semi-finals

Summary

The semi-finals will be played over one leg.

|+West Region

|+East Region

West Region

East Region

Final

The final will be played over two legs.

Notes

References

External links
 , the-AFC.com

3